Anti-reticular Cytotoxic Serum is made from the blood of a rabbit that has been injected with homogenized cadaver spleen and rib marrow. In small quantities it can aid animal growth, but is toxic in large doses. It was first developed by Alexander A. Bogomolets in 1936.

"It was a "miracle" that Professor Bogomolets made dying people walk with blood of cadavers circulating through their bodies, or hoped to extend our life-span for 150 years with the help of the A.C.S serum" - Red Miracle: The Story of Soviet Medicine; by Edward Podolsky

Sources

World Book Encyclopedia, 1967 edition, p. 28

Toxicology
Veterinary drugs
Drugs in the Soviet Union
Soviet inventions